Rautio is a former municipality, now a small village of Kalajoki, Finland. It was consolidated to Kalajoki in 1973.

History 
The name Rautio comes from a word meaning "blacksmith". Rautio has existed at least since 1547, at the time it only had three farms. It was a part of the Kalajoki parish.

Rautio became a chapel community in 1826. In 1912, it became a separate parish and municipality.

Rautio was merged back into Kalajoki in 1973.

People born in Rautio
Leonard Typpö (1868 – 1922)
Elias Simojoki (1899 – 1940)

References 

Former municipalities of Finland
Kalajoki
Villages in Finland